Frank Walsh (born September 5, 1976 in St John's) is a Canadian rugby union prop. He debuted for  against  in 2008. Walsh was a member of the Canadian 2011 Rugby World Cup squad.

External links
2011 RWC Profile
ESPN Scrum Profile

1976 births
Living people
Canadian rugby union players
Canada international rugby union players
Rugby union props